Irreligion in Turkey refers to the extent of the lack, rejection of, or indifference towards religion in the Republic of Turkey. Based on surveys, Islam is the predominant religion and irreligious people form a minority in Turkey, although precise estimates of the share of Deists, atheists, agnostics, and other unaffiliated people in the population vary, though in the survey averages they make up more percentages than Christians and Jews in the country. 

One study in Turkey reported that 95% believe in God while 75% are religious. Another study conducted by the French company Ipsos which interviewed 17,180 adults across 22 countries, stated that atheists accounted for 7% of those who were interviewed from Turkey while agnostics accounted for 3%.

Overview
It is difficult to quantify the number of Deists, atheists, and agnostics in Turkey, as they are not officially counted in the national census unlike Christians, Jews, and other religious groups. But religious information on both online and physical identity cards can either be blanked out or changed on the wish of the ID holder by requesting, with either a visit to the local municipal office or by an e-signature in the official government website or app. Since irreligiousness is not counted as “religion”, atheism, agnosticism, and such are left as blanked out. Data also suggests that 85% of all irreligious people in Turkey are younger than 35. 

There is a great stigma attached to being an atheist in Turkey, and thus a lot of the Turkish atheist community, rather than forming individual groups, teams, organizations and communities in real life, actively communicate with each other actively via internet forms and channels across many sites. But specially today, such beliefs being expressed freely or discussed in the public is not uncommon at all, and rather quite common.

According to a poll made by MAK (Mehmet Ali Kulat of Ankara) in 2017, 86% of the Turkish population declared they believe in God. 76% declared they believe Quran and other holy books came through revelation by God while 14% said no they don't believe that it did while 10% did not answer. According to a survey by the pollster KONDA, the percentage of atheists in Turkey has tripled in 10 years and rose from 1% in 2008 to 3% in 2018, while the percentage of non-believers passed from 1% to 2%. Among those aged between 15 and 29 years old, these figures rise to respectively 4% and 4%.
According to another poll made in 2019 by OPTİMAR, which interviewed 3,500 people 89.5% of those interviewed declared they believe in Islam, while 4.5% identified as Deists, 2.7% identified as agnostics, and 1.6% as atheists. 

A survey conducted by MAK in 2020 found that among the Turkish people interviewed, more than 8,000 young adults between the ages of 18 and 29 (82.8%) of the Turkish young adults identified "as a person who has religious beliefs", while 7.7% reported they have no belief, 9.5% gave no reply, and 72.7% believed in the afterlife, while 11.7% did not believe in it and 15.6% gave no reply. Another poll conducted by Gezici Araştırma in 2020 interviewed 1,062 people in 12 provinces and found that 28.5% of the Generation Z in Turkey identify as irreligious.

An early April 2018 report of the Turkish Ministry of Education, titled The Youth is Sliding towards Deism, observed that an increasing number of pupils in İmam Hatip schools was repudiating Islam in favour of Deism (irreligious belief in a creator God). The report's publication generated large-scale controversy in the Turkish press and society at large, as well as amongst conservative Islamic sects, Muslim clerics, and Islamist parties in Turkey. The progressive Muslim theologian Mustafa Öztürk noted the Deistic trend among Turkish people a year earlier, arguing that the "very archaic, dogmatic notion of religion" held by the majority of those claiming to represent Islam was causing "the new generations [to get] indifferent, even distant, to the Islamic worldview". Despite lacking reliable statistical data, numerous anecdotes and independent surveys appear to point in this direction. Although some commentators claim that the secularization of Turkey is merely a result of Western influence or even an alleged "conspiracy", other commentators, even some pro-government ones, have come to the conclusion that "the real reason for the loss of faith in Islam is not the West but Turkey itself".

Statistics

Belief in God and religious organizations among Turks, OPTİMAR Survey 2019:
 
 89.5 % responded "I believe in God's existence and oneness." (Believer)
 4.5 % responded "I think there is a creator, but I don't believe in religions." (Deist)
 2.7 % responded "I'm not sure if there is a creator." (Agnostic)
 1.7 % responded "I don't think there is a creator." (Atheist)
 1.7 % responded no answer.

Religiosity of Turkish people, KONDA 2018:
51% defined themselves as "a religious person who strives to fulfill religious obligations" (Religious)
34% defined themselves as "a believer who does not fulfill religious obligations" (Not religious).
10% defined themselves as "a fully devout person fulfilling all religious obligations" (Fully devout).
2% defined themselves as "someone who does not believe in religious obligations" (Non-believer).
3% defined themselves as "someone with no religious conviction" (Atheist).
Among those aged between 15 and 29 years old:
 43% defined themselves as "a religious person who strives to fulfill religious obligations" (Religious)
45% defined themselves as "a believer who does not fulfill religious obligations" (Not religious).
5% defined themselves as "a fully devout person fulfilling all religious obligations" (Fully devout).
4% defined themselves as "someone who does not believe in religious obligations" (Non-believer).
4% defined themselves as "someone with no religious conviction" (Atheist).
Among those aged between 15 and 20 old:
55.8% defined themselves as "a believer who does not fulfill religious obligations" (Not religious).
28.5% defined themselves as "Irreligious" (Non-believer).
15.7% defined themselves as "a religious person who fulfills religious obligations such as fasting and praying" (Religious).

Irreligious organizations in Turkey
Association of Atheism (Ateizm Derneği), the first official atheist organization based in the Middle East and Caucasus, was founded in 2014. In 2018, it was reported in some media outlets that the Ateizm Derneği would close down because of the pressure on its members and attacks by pro-government media, but the association itself issued a clarification that this was not the case and that it was still active.

List of famous irreligious Turks

Adalet Ağaoğlu 
Ahmet Altan
Çetin Altan
Mustafa Kemal Atatürk (allegedly)
Rıdvan Aydemir
Ulus Baker
Bahadır Baruter
Pelin Batu
Bedri Baykam
Murat Belge
Halil Berktay
Behice Boran
Abdullah Cevdet
Sinan Çetin
Muazzez İlmiye Çığ
Dilsa Demirbag Sten
Turan Dursun
Süreyyya Evren
Tevfik Fikret
Deniz Gezmiş
Osman Necmi Gürmen
Nâzım Hikmet
İlhan İrem
Jahrein
Sagopa Kajmer
Dursun Karataş
İbrahim Kaypakkaya
Fikret Kızılok
Lale Mansur
Aziz Nesin
Sevan Nişanyan
Ayşe Önal
Ahmet Rıza
İlyas Salman
Fazıl Say
Ruhi Su
Barbaros Şansal
Celâl Şengör
Ahmet Şık
Arzu Toker
Uğur Uluocak
Mina Urgan
Cenk Uygur
Serra Yılmaz
Can Yücel

See also
Abolition of the Caliphate
Abolition of the Ottoman sultanate
Atatürk's nationalism
Christianity in Turkey
Demographics of Turkey
Freedom of religion in Turkey
Islam in Turkey
Kemalism
Religion in Turkey
Secularism in Turkey
Turkification

References

Religion in Turkey
Turkey